Wang Tanzhi, also known by his courtesy name Wéndù (王文度), was an official in the Eastern Jin Dynasty, 4th century CE. He had served under the general Huan Wen until the latter's death in 373, he, together with Xie An, became the guardian of the young emperor.

References
A Chinese biographical directory, Volumes 1-2. Giles, Herbert Allen.

Jin dynasty (266–420) people